Walk Out is a 2007 album by Lady Saw.

Composition 
Some of the songs were classified as more "vulnerable" and less explicit than her previous work. In "No Less Than a Woman (Infertility)", Saw discusses her personal experiences with infertility. "Not the World's Prettiest" has been classified as "lilting R&B" and criticized Western conceptions of beauty; its theme was compared favorably to "Unpretty" by TLC.

Reception

Critical 
 

On the review aggregate site Album of the Year, Walk Out holds a score of 80 out of 100. Allmusic awarded the album four stars out of five; a review for the outlet, written by David Jeffries, likened it to Prince's early releases and deemed it "an exciting mix of shocking, intoxicating, daring, and sure." Writing for the Lincoln Journal Star, Brett Johnson regarded the album as evidence that Saw "endures not only because of her sharp tongue but her big heart." In the July 2007 issue of Vibe, as part of a feature on a reggae recording studio, the album was highlighted as being in "Heavy Rotation".

Commercial 
The album became Saw's fourth entry on the Billboard Reggae Albums chart, on which it peaked at number eight.

Track listing 

 Hello Lady Saw
 Big up
 Me and My Crew (The RAE)
 Silly Dreams
 No Less Than A Woman (Infertility)
 Not World's Prettiest
 You Need Me
 Baby Dry Your Eyes
 Walk Out
 Chat To Mi Back
 It's Like That
 Power of the Pum
 Like it
 Stray Dog

Charts

References 

2007 albums
Lady Saw albums